Communauté d'agglomération du Nord Basse-Terre is a communauté d'agglomération, an intercommunal structure in the Guadeloupe overseas department and region of France. Created in 2010, its seat is in Sainte-Rose. Its area is 464.8 km2. Its population was 76,742 in 2019.

Composition
The communauté d'agglomération consists of the following 6 communes:
Deshaies
Goyave
Lamentin
Petit-Bourg
Pointe-Noire
Sainte-Rose

References

Nord Basse-Terre
Nord Basse-Terre